Marija Vučenović (Serbian Cyrillic:Марија Вученовић, born 3 April 1993) is a Serbian athlete specialising in the javelin throw. She won bronze medals at the 2012 World Under-20 Championships and 2013 European U23 Championships.

Her personal best in the event is 62.25 metres set in Split in 2021.

Achievements

International competitions

National titles
 Serbian Athletics Championships
 Javelin throw: 2015, 2016, 2018, 2019, 2020, 2021

References

External links
 
 
 
 
 

1993 births
Living people
Serbian female javelin throwers
Serbian expatriate sportspeople in the United States
Athletes (track and field) at the 2020 Summer Olympics
Olympic athletes of Serbia